Soapstone is an unincorporated community in Pittsylvania County, in the U.S. state of Virginia. It holds the world's largest deposit of soapstone.

References

Unincorporated communities in Virginia
Unincorporated communities in Pittsylvania County, Virginia